Free Running is a 2007 video game for the PlayStation 2, PlayStation Portable, Wii and Microsoft Windows, developed by Rebellion Developments and Core Design and published by Ubisoft, Reef Entertainment, and Graffiti Entertainment. A Nintendo DS version was planned, but cancelled.

Gameplay
Free Running is a freerunning sports game, with mechanics similar to those found in skateboarding titles such as the Tony Hawk's series. The objective of the game is a representation of freerunning, and players must demonstrate speed, rather than flamboyance. The player is required to navigate their character through an urban environment by climbing, leaping, wall-running and other acrobatic maneuvers. Points are earned by performing combinations of such moves, and completing mini-challenges such as checkpoint races. The Wii port is played with either the Wii Remote and Nunchuk, or the Classic Controller.

Reception

The game received "mixed" reviews on all platforms according to the review aggregation website Metacritic. Eurogamer criticized the PlayStation 2 version's stiff controls and camera, leading to unease in performing tricks and combinations. It did not compare favourably to the fluid movement in Prince of Persia: The Sands of Time and Crackdown – titles that were deemed to be better free running games than Free Running.

References

External links
 

2007 video games
Cancelled Nintendo DS games
Extreme sports video games
Parkour video games
PlayStation 2 games
PlayStation Portable games
Sports video games
Wii games
Windows games
Rebellion Developments games
Video games developed in the United Kingdom
Video games scored by Peter Connelly
Reef Entertainment games
Multiplayer and single-player video games
Ubisoft games
Core Design games
Graffiti Entertainment games